Daniel Carmon (Hebrew: דניאל כרמון) is an Israeli diplomat who served as the ambassador of Israel to India and non resident ambassador to Sri Lanka and Bhutan, from 2014 to 2018.

Biography
Carmon was born in Tel Aviv in 1951 and attended high schools in Jerusalem, Istanbul and Paris. From 1970 to 1973, he served as a paratrooper in the Israeli Defense Forces, where he attained the rank of lieutenant. In 1973, he began his studies at the Hebrew University in Jerusalem, where he graduated with BA in International Relations.

Diplomatic career

After his graduation from Hebrew University in 1973, he joined the Ministry of Foreign Affairs. From 1978 to 1982, he served as an attaché at the Embassy of Israel in Washington, D.C., United States, during which he served as a member of the Israeli delegation to the 1978 Camp David peace talks between Israel and Egypt. From 1983 to 1985, he worked at a high-tech company as its commercial director, before returning to the Ministry of Foreign Affairs.

Carmon served as the Consul and Administrative Officer, and as Deputy Chief of Mission at the Embassy of Israel in Buenos Aires, Argentina. On 17 March 1992, the embassy was attacked by a suicide bomber, killing 29 civilians and injuring 242 more. Among the dead was Carmon's wife Eliora, while Carmon himself was injured in the attack.

In 1995, he returned to Israel where he was assigned to the Situation Emergency Room in the Foreign Ministry, where he served as its head. After serving in numerous positions within the ministry, he was appointed as Ambassador and Deputy Permanent Representative at Israel's Mission to the United Nations in New York in 2005.

From 2011 to 2014, he served as Deputy Director General of the Foreign Affairs Ministry and as head of MASHAV, which is Israel's agency for international development cooperation, and later as the Senior Deputy Director-General within the Foreign Affairs Ministry.

On July 2014, Carmon was appointed as Ambassador of Israel to India and Non-Resident Ambassador to Sri Lanka and Bhutan. On July 31, he presented his credentials to President of India Pranab Mukherjee. Carmon served this position till 2018 and was succeeded by Ron Malka.

Personal life
With his former wife Eliora, Carmon had six children. He is fluent in Hebrew, English, Spanish and French.

In 2013, he was recipient of the highest award of Excellence of Israel’s Public Service.

References

1951 births
Living people
Israeli Jews
Hebrew University of Jerusalem alumni
Ambassadors of Israel to India
Ambassadors of Israel to Sri Lanka
Ambassadors to Bhutan
Israeli expatriates in Turkey
Israeli expatriates in France
People from Tel Aviv
Survivors of terrorist attacks